The Victory Medal is a Romanian First World War campaign medal established on 20 July 1921 by Royal Decree.

The design and ribbon was also adopted by Belgium, Brazil, Cuba, Czechoslovakia, France, Greece, Italy, Japan, Portugal, Romania, Siam, Union of South Africa and the US in accordance with the decision of the Inter-Allied Peace Conference at Versailles (a Winged Victory). A particular form of the historic Greek monument of 'Victoria' was chosen by each nation, except the nations in the Far East who issued the medal but with a different design.

Eligibility
To qualify for the Victory Medal, recipients, of any rank, had to be mobilised for war service and to have taken part in a battle between 28 August 1916 and 31 March 1921, or to have served as an army medic. Thus were also included the combatants from the Hungarian–Romanian War.

Description

The design proposals of the medal were to be submitted to an international jury. For the Romanian version, the jury selected the design of Lt. Col. Constantin Kristescu, who was also put in charge with its effective sculpting. It was manufactured in Paris, where Kristescu used to work with La Maison Arthus-Bertrand. The Victory Medal issued by Romania is a 36mm diameter circular bronze medal.

 The obverse of the Romanian version shows the winged, full-length, full-front, standing figure of 'Victory', holding a palm branch in her left hand and a sword pointing downward in her right hand.
 The reverse has the words "MARELE RĂZBOI / PENTRU / CIVILIZAȚIE" ("The Great War / For / Civilization") in three lines, over a halberd, all surrounded by a ring with twenty links braided with a laurel and oak wreath. On each of the ten large links is engraved the name of one of the Allied countries: England, Belgium, Greece, Japan, Serbia, United States, China, Romania, Italy and France. The sculptor signed himself as 'Kristesko' near Japan's link.
 The 39mm wide ribbon has an iridescent colour scheme, with the violet moving through to a central red stripe where both schemes meet.

Usage and hierarchy

The medal was displayed on official occasions and ceremonies on the left breast of the jacket. On other occasions, it was customary to display only the ribbon bar, pinned on the left buttonhole. In the hierarchy of the Romanian military and civil awards and decorations from the mid 1930s, the Victory Medal held the very low 33rd place. The customary hierarchy of the military decorations was (not including those from the Independence War):

 Order of Michael the Brave
 The Military Virtue
 The Aeronautical Virtue
 The Cross of Queen Marie
 The Sanitary Merit Cross
 Valour and Faith with swords
 The Country's Momentum
 Commemorative Cross of the 1916–1918 War
 Victory Medal

International award
As well as Romania, a significant number of allied and associated countries involved in the conflict against the Austro-German alliance issued a Victory Medal.

The proposition of such common award was first made by French marshal Ferdinand Foch who was supreme commander of the allied force during the war.  Each medal in bronze has the same diameter (36 mm) and ribbon (double rainbow) but with a national design representing a winged victory except for Japan and Siam where the concept of a winged victory was not culturally relevant.

See also
Order of Michael the Brave
Commemorative Cross of the 1916–1918 War

References

External links
Romanian Victory Medal at "Romanian Medals & Orders".

Military awards and decorations of Romania
Interallied Victory Medals of World War I